Kiki Farrel (born May 26, 1985) is an Indonesian actor. Farrel began his career by working as an extra in a number of sitcoms, and eventually participated in the Supermama Selebconcert with his mother, Mama Dahlia. He starred in the soap opera Cinta Kirana.

Filmography

TV series

TV Movies
 Mercy Milik Joko
 Cintaku Selegit Dodol (SCTV 2009)
 Cinta Dalam Segelas Blueberry
 Dicari Pendamping Wisuda (SCTV 2010)
 Pemandu Cinta Dari Citarik (SCTV 2010)
 Pangeran Salju Dan Putri Arang (August 20, 2012)
 Cinta Bersemi di 22 Hari (SCTV September 2, 2012)
 Sumpah I Love Bakso (SCTV November 24, 2012)
 Jujur Baskara (RCTI - November 24, 2012)
 Love In Warteg (RCTI - January 8, 2013)
 From Udik With Love (SCTV January 27, 2013)
 Cinta Si Biang Onar (November 7, 2012)
 Sicantik Ketemu Cinta (SCTV November 27, 2012)
 Kucuci Cintamu (SCTV January 8, 2013)
 Ketusuk Paku Cinta Tukang Tambal Ban (SCTV 2012)
 Jaka Tarub Mencari Kucing Anggora SCTV 2012
 Benci Tapi Cinta (SCTV August 8, 2013)
 Catatan Bodyguard Si Boy (TRANSTV 2013)
 Hutan Belakang Sekolah (TRANSTV 2013)
 Boss Doni (KompasTV 2013)

References

1986 births
Living people
Indonesian male film actors